Thomas Darcy may refer to:

Thomas Darcy (judge) (died 1529), Irish cleric and judge
Thomas Darcy, 1st Baron Darcy de Darcy (1467–1537), English statesman and rebel leader
Thomas Darcy, 1st Baron Darcy of Chiche (1506–1558), English courtier during the reign of Edward VI
Thomas Darcy, 1st Earl Rivers (c. 1565–1640), English peer and courtier
Thomas F. Darcy (1932–2000), American political cartoonist
Thomas F. Darcy Jr. (1895–1968), composer and leader of the US Army Band
Tom Darcy (footballer) (1881–1955), South Melbourne footballer
Tom Darcy (Australian politician) (1893–1979), politician in Australia

See also
Tom Darcey (1906–?), Australian Olympic rower
Thomas D'Arcy (born 1979), Canadian singer and songwriter
Tommy D'Arcy (1932–1985), Scottish footballer